Celso Casimiro Domingos (born 12 July 1996 in Faro) known as Celsinho, is a Portuguese professional footballer who plays for Valadares Gaia as a defender.

Football career
On 16 September 2015, Celsinho made his professional debut with Farense in a 2015–16 Segunda Liga match against Braga B.

References

External links

Stats and profile at LPFP 

1996 births
Living people
People from Faro, Portugal
Portuguese footballers
Association football defenders
Liga Portugal 2 players
S.C. Farense players
Sertanense F.C. players
Sport Benfica e Castelo Branco players
Sportspeople from Faro District